is a 1980 Japanese film directed by Kazuo Kuroki.

Release
Yūgure made was received a roadshow theatrical release in Japan on September 20, 1980 where it was distributed by Toho. It received a general release on October 4, 1980.

Awards
2nd Yokohama Film Festival
Won: Best Supporting Actor - Morio Kazama

References

Footnotes

Sources

External links
 

1980 films
Films directed by Kazuo Kuroki
1980s Japanese films